Eosinophilic pustular folliculitis of infancy  is a cutaneous condition characterized by recurrent pruritic crops of follicular vesiculopustular lesions.

See also 
 Eosinophilic pustular folliculitis
 List of cutaneous conditions

References 

Eosinophilic cutaneous conditions